Ivan Fatić (born 21 August 1988) is a Montenegrin retired football player who played as a defender or midfielder. He Is manager in youth categories of Rudar Pljevlja.

Club career

Italy
Fatić was signed by Italian Serie A side Internazionale from relegated Chievo on 4 July 2007, for €170,000. Chievo still hold half of the player's registration rights.

He made his first team (official match) debut against Reggina Calcio on 19 December 2007, a Coppa Italia match, he also played the return leg. On 9 June 2008 Internazionale announced that's they loaned Fatić to Vicenza to play 2008–09 season.

In June 2009, Genoa bought half of the rights of the defender from Chievo after Chievo had bought Inter's 50% stake in the player. It was part of the deal that Diego Milito and Thiago Motta move to Internazionale. Half of its contractual value was valued €200,000 at that time. He spent a season with Genoa and played as a fullback or wing back in 3–5–2 formation. This co-ownership deal was renewed on 26 July 2010 with Fatić to remain with Genoa. However, he was subsequently loaned to Cesena for the 2010–11 season.

In June 2011 Chievo bought back Fatić for €200,000. That week Genoa also sold defender Francesco Acerbi to Chievo for €2 million as part of the deal that Kévin Constant joined Genoa for €7.8 million. On 31 August 2011, Fatić left for Empoli F.C. After returning from Empoli, Chievo again sent Fatić to Serie B, this time on loan to Hellas Verona F.C.

On 31 January 2013 he was signed by U.S. Lecce.

Serbia
On 28 July 2013 Fatić returned to Serbia for Vojvodina in 2+1 year contract. On 10 October 2013 the contract was terminated.

Malaysia and Bosnia-Herzegovina
In November 2014, he was signed by Sarawak FA to play in Malaysia Super League. He played for 25 games and scored 3 goals before moving to Bosnian club, FK Slobodan Tuzla, on July 1, 2016 where he appeared in 10 games and scored 1 goal for them.

International career
Fatić made his debut for Montenegro in a June 2009 FIFA World Cup qualification match away against Cyprus and has earned a total of 6 caps, scoring no goals. His final international was a June 2011 European Championship qualification match against Bulgaria.

References

External links

1988 births
Living people
Sportspeople from Pljevlja
Association football central defenders
Montenegrin footballers
Montenegro under-21 international footballers
Montenegro international footballers
Inter Milan players
L.R. Vicenza players
U.S. Salernitana 1919 players
Genoa C.F.C. players
A.C. Cesena players
A.C. ChievoVerona players
Empoli F.C. players
Hellas Verona F.C. players
U.S. Lecce players
FK Vojvodina players
FK Rudar Pljevlja players
Sarawak FA players
FK Sloboda Tuzla players
FK Shkupi players
FC Samtredia players
Buxoro FK players
Serie A players
Serie B players
Serbian SuperLiga players
Montenegrin First League players
Malaysia Super League players
Premier League of Bosnia and Herzegovina players
Macedonian First Football League players
Erovnuli Liga players
Uzbekistan Super League players
Montenegrin expatriate footballers
Expatriate footballers in Italy
Montenegrin expatriate sportspeople in Italy
Expatriate footballers in Serbia
Montenegrin expatriate sportspeople in Serbia
Expatriate footballers in Malaysia
Montenegrin expatriate sportspeople in Malaysia
Expatriate footballers in Bosnia and Herzegovina
Montenegrin expatriate sportspeople in Bosnia and Herzegovina
Expatriate footballers in North Macedonia
Montenegrin expatriate sportspeople in North Macedonia
Expatriate footballers in Georgia (country)
Montenegrin expatriate sportspeople in Georgia (country)
Expatriate footballers in Uzbekistan
Montenegrin expatriate sportspeople in Uzbekistan